Mohsen Sazegara (born 5 January 1955) calls himself as Iranian journalist and pro-democracy political activist. He was the founder of IRGC (Iran Revolutionary Guard Corps) after the revolution in 1979.  He held several offices in the Government of Mir-Hossein Mousavi. He applied to become a candidate for President of Iran in the 2001 election but was declined.

His reformist policies clashed with the Supreme Leader, Ali Khamenei, eventually resulting in his arrest in early 2003. Following his release in August 2003, he moved to the United Kingdom for medical attention. He currently resides in the United States.

Early career
In the late-1970s, Sazegara was an undergraduate student at both Sharif University of Technology in Iran and the Illinois Institute of Technology, during which time he was a leader of the student movement against the Shah. During the 1979 revolution, he returned to Iran and served as a founder of the Revolutionary Guard Corps and the managing director of the National Radio of Iran (1979–1981). In the 1980s, Sazegara served as political deputy in the prime minister's office, deputy minister of heavy industries, chairman of the Industrial Development and Renovation Organization of Iran, and vice minister of planning and budget.

Sazegara became disillusioned with the Islamic Republic government. Following the end of the Iran–Iraq War in 1988 and the death of Ayatollah Khomeini in 1989, he turned down further government posts, saying that his refusal was in order to continue his study of history.

Studies and reform
Sazegara earned his master's degree in history at Shahid Beheshti University in Iran, and went on to complete his doctoral thesis on religious intellectuals and the Islamic revolution at the University of London 1996. After the 1997 election of reformist President Mohammad Khatami, Sazegara published several reformist newspapers including Jameah, Tus, and Golestan-e-Iran, all of which were closed by the hard-line regime. 

Believing that reform would be impossible with the current Iranian Constitution, he launched a campaign to hold a referendum on the constitution. His drive to amend  the constitution gained strong support among many students. In 2001, Dr. Sazegara became a presidential candidate; however, his candidacy was refused by the Guardian Council, reportedly because his opinions were "not congruent with the wishes of the Guardian Council and the Supreme Leader."

Arrest
On Tuesday, February 18, 2003, Sazegara was arrested by the Ministry of Intelligence, and  held for five days, during which he protested by hunger strike. His arrest was protested by the journalism associations the World Association of Newspapers and the World Editors Forum, which together represent over 18,000 publications in 100 countries. Amnesty International named him a prisoner of conscience and called for his immediate release.

Later that same year, he was arrested again on June 15, this time with his eldest son Vahid Sazegara, on the order of Tehran's Public Prosecutor Saeed Mortazavi. Vahid Sazegara was released July 9, but Mohsen Sazegara went on to spend 114 days in custody and 79 days on a hunger strike, during which he lost almost 50 pounds of his body weight. This was especially troubling, since Sazegara suffers from severe heart problems, having had two heart operations within the previous few years. After his release from Evin Prison, he left Iran to seek medical attention in the United Kingdom.

Continued activism
In the United Kingdom he called for a referendum and launched an Internet petition, on which he gained the signatures of over 35,000 people. His continued calls for reform in Iran have led the regime to sentence him in absentia to seven years in prison, without clear charges.

In March 2005, he left the UK to attend to a job opportunity in the United States at the Washington Institute for Near East Policy as a visiting scholar. Following a six-month term, he left the Washington Institute for Near East Policy for Yale University's Center for International and Area Studies. By the end of the educational year he left Yale University to work at Harvard University as a researcher on Iran. As of February 2010, Sazegara has been "preaching" a "message of nonviolent action on a nightly basis," through videos calling on Iranian dissidents to avoid fragmentation and unite behind former presidential candidate Mir Hossein Mousavi.

As of 2010, he was a visiting fellow at the George W. Bush Institute at Southern Methodist University in Dallas, Texas.

Sazegara is a devout Muslim, and advocates for a separation of religion and state in Iran.

Notes and references

External links

 Mohsen Sazegara's Weblog
 Mohsen Sazegara  Freedom Collection interview
 BBC Radio 4: Taking a Stand BBC journalist Fergal Keane interviews Mohsen Sazegara about his life in a radio programme first broadcast on BBC Radio 4 on December 14, 2010.

1955 births
Living people
Alumni of the University of London
Amnesty International prisoners of conscience held by Iran
Illinois Institute of Technology alumni
Iranian democracy activists
Iranian emigrants to the United States
Iranian newspaper publishers (people)
Iranian reformists
Iranian Vice Ministers
Sharif University of Technology alumni
Iranian emigrants to the United Kingdom
Islamic Revolutionary Guard Corps officers
Iranian prisoners and detainees
Freedom Movement of Iran politicians
Inmates of Evin Prison